The 2021–22 Auburn Tigers men's basketball team represented Auburn University during the 2021–22 NCAA Division I men's basketball season as a member of the Southeastern Conference. The team's head coach was Bruce Pearl in his eighth season at Auburn.  The team played their home games at Neville Arena in Auburn, Alabama. They finished the season 28–6, 15–3 in SEC play to finish as regular season champions. As the No. 1 seed, they were defeated by No. 8 seed Texas A&M in the quarterfinals. They received an at-large bid to the NCAA tournament as the No. 2 seed in the Midwest Region, where they defeated Jacksonville State in the First Round before being upset by Miami in the Second Round.

On January 24, 2022, the team was voted first in the AP poll for the first time in program history, in the midst of a nineteen game winning streak.

Previous season
The 2020–21 Auburn Tigers men's basketball team finished the 2020–21 season 13–14, 7–11 in SEC play. Due to a self-imposed postseason ban following former assistant coach Chuck Person's involvement in the 2017–18 NCAA Division I men's basketball corruption scandal, the Tigers were ineligible to compete in the SEC tournament and the NCAA tournament.

Offseason

Departures
Auburn lost five players from the 2020–21 team. Freshmen Sharife Cooper and JT Thor were selected in the NBA draft, and Javon Franklin, Jamal Johnson, and Justin Powell transferred.

Incoming transfers

2021 recruiting class

|}

Roster

Schedule

|-
!colspan=9 style=|Exhibition

|-
!colspan=9 style=|Regular season

|-
! colspan=9 style=| SEC Tournament
|-

|-
! colspan=9 style=| NCAA tournament
|-

Rankings

See also
2021–22 Auburn Tigers women's basketball team

Notes

References

Auburn
Auburn Tigers men's basketball seasons
Auburn Tigers men's basketball
Auburn Tigers men's basketball
Auburn